John Tenny Blount (January 29, 1873 – December 22, 1934) was an American sports executive, who owned the Detroit Stars of the Negro National League. He was a friend of Rube Foster, and served as president of the Negro National League. Blount was a numbers banker and ran a gambling establishment.

References

External links
  Seamheads
Obituary

1873 births
1934 deaths
Sportspeople from Montgomery, Alabama
Baseball executives
Negro league baseball executives